A temple dedicated to the Hindu God Shiva located near the Kalasipalya Bus Stand, Bangalore, Karnataka, India. The temple dates back to the Chola era and was renovated by Kempegowda. The unique feature of this temple is it contains three sanctums dedicated to Jalakantheshwara, Parvathi and Kailashnathar.

References

Hindu temples in Bangalore
Shiva temples in Karnataka